The Sindh Local Government Ordinance, 2001 was an ordinance passed by the Provincial Assembly of Sindh, Pakistan, on August 14th, 2001, as part of a series of local government ordinances prepared by the National Reconstruction Bureau passed together by each of the four provinces at the time.

The ordinance was repealed with an act restoring the local government ordinance of 1979 by acting Governor Nisar Ahmed Khuhro following a political row between the PPP and MQM over statements made by Dr. Zulfiqar Mirza.

See also 

 Sindh Act, 2011
 Sindh Local Government Ordinance, 1979
The Sindh Local Government Act, 2013

References

2001 in Pakistani law
Local government in Sindh
Local government legislation
Local Government Ordinance, 2001
Repealed Pakistani legislation